Angela may refer to:

Places 
 Angela, Montana
 Angela Lake, in Volusia County, Florida
 Lake Angela, in Lyon Township, Oakland County, Michigan
 Lake Angela, the reservoir impounded by the source dam of the South Yuba River

Fiction
 Angela (character), in the Spawn and Marvel universes
 Angela (Inheritance), a character in the Inheritance Cycle novels
 Angela Martin, a character in The Office
 Angela, a character in the Gargoyles TV series
 Angela, a character in the Stranger Things Netflix TV Series, portplayed by Elodie Grace Orkin

Music
 angela (band), from Japan
 Angela (album) by José Feliciano, 1976
 "Angela" (The Lumineers song), 2016
 "Angela" (Jarvis Cocker song), 2009
 "Angela" (Bee Gees song), 1987
 "Angela", a song by John Lennon and Yoko Ono from their album Some Time in New York City
 "Angela", a song by Mötley Crüe from Decade of Decadence
 "Angela", a song by Saïan Supa Crew from the album KLR
 "Angela", a song by Super Junior from Sorry, Sorry
 "Angela", a song by Toto from their self-titled album
 "Angela", the theme for the TV series Taxi by Bob James on his album Touchdown
 "Angela", a song by No Use For a Name from their album Hard Rock Bottom

People 
 Angela (enslaved woman) (historical records from 1619–1625)
 Angela (given name)
 Angela (surname)

Films and TV
 Angela (1955 film)
 Angela (1978 film)
 Angela (1995 film)
 Angela (2002 film)
 Angela, a 1928 musical starring Jeanette MacDonald, music and lyrics by Alberta Nichols and Mann Holiner 
 Angel-A, a 2005 film
 Ángela (telenovela), a Mexican telenovela
Angela (TV series), international title for the Philippines drama Haplos

Other uses
 Angela (mantis), a genus of praying mantises

See also 

 Angie (disambiguation)
 Angel (disambiguation)
 Tropical Storm Angela (disambiguation)
 Angeli (disambiguation)
 Angelo (disambiguation)